Lake Kohlmeier is a large artificial pond in Owatonna, Minnesota. It was created in an abandoned gravel mine using the natural flooding of springwater. The lake is named after the former owner of the property and operator of the aggregate business once operated there.  The lake once hosted the municipal beach and continues to be used for swimming, fishing, and boating.

External links
 Minnesota Department of Natural Resources: Lake Information Report

Kohlmeier
Kohlmeier
Tourist attractions in Steele County, Minnesota